Melchior Mbonimpa (born 1955) is a Burundian-Canadian writer. He is most noted for his novel Les morts ne sont pas morts, which won the Prix Christine-Dumitriu-Van-Saanen from the Salon du livre de Toronto in 2006. He was previously a finalist for the same award in 2002 for Le totem des Baranda, and in 2004 for Le dernier roi faiseur de pluie.

A professor of philosophy in the department of religious studies at Laurentian University in Sudbury, Ontario, he has written both novels and non-fiction work on African politics. In 2019, he was named one of the 25 most important Black Canadian personalities in Franco-Ontarian culture by Ici Radio-Canada.

Le totem des Baranda was selected for the 2021 edition of Le Combat des livres, where it was defended by filmmaker Tanya Lapointe.

Works

Fiction
 Le totem des Baranda (2001, Prise de parole)
 Le dernier roi faiseur de pluie (2003, Prise de parole)
 Les morts ne sont pas morts (2006, Prise de parole)
 La terre sans mal (2008, Prise de parole)
 La tribu de Sangwa (2012, Prise de parole)
 Diangombé l'Immortel (2015)
 Au sommet du Nanzerwé il s'est assis et il a pleuré (2020)

Non-fiction
 Idéologies de l’indépendance africaine (1989)
 Hutu, Tutsi, Twa (1993)
 Ethnicité et démocratie en Afrique (1994)
 Défis actuels de l’identité chrétienne (1996)
 La Pax Americana en Afrique des Grands Lacs (2000)

References

1955 births
20th-century Canadian non-fiction writers
20th-century Canadian male writers
21st-century Canadian non-fiction writers
21st-century Canadian novelists
21st-century Canadian male writers
Canadian male novelists
Canadian male non-fiction writers
Canadian novelists in French
Canadian non-fiction writers in French
Academic staff of Laurentian University
Black Canadian writers
Burundian emigrants to Canada
Burundian writers
Franco-Ontarian people
Living people
Writers from Greater Sudbury